Step Up: All In is a 2014 American dance film directed by Trish Sie (in her feature film directorial debut) and written by John Swetnam. It serves as a sequel to Step Up Revolution and the fifth and final installment in the Step Up film series. The film stars Ryan Guzman, Briana Evigan, Stephen "tWitch" Boss, Misha Gabriel, Izabella Miko, Alyson Stoner, and Adam Sevani.

Step Up: All In was released in the United States on August 8, 2014, by Summit Entertainment. The film was grossed over $86 million worldwide and received mixed reviews from critics.

Plot

Sean Asa and his flashmob crew, The Mob, have relocated from Miami, Florida to Los Angeles, where they are now trying to make a living from dancing, but are turned down at every audition. After being refused at another audition, the Mob visits a club where they are noticed and challenged to a dance battle by another crew, the Grim Knights. The Grim Knights win the battle and the Mob decides to pack up and leave Los Angeles and return to Miami, mostly because of financial difficulties, but also thinking there is nothing left for them and that they are not prepared for Los Angeles.

Sean decides to stay and while there, he notices a dance competition called The Vortex taking place with the prize being a three-year Las Vegas booking, inspiring him to put together a new crew with help from Moose. Moose gets Sean a job working as a janitor in a dance center owned by Moose's grandparents, where Sean takes up residence in a janitor's closet. Sean and Moose recruit Andie West and later Vladd, Violet, Hair, Chad, Monster, the Santiago Twins, Jenny Kido and Gauge to the crew. The group soon makes an audition video as the LMNTRIX and are accepted into the competition a few weeks later.

The crew heads to Las Vegas to compete. Upon arriving, Sean finds out that both the Grim Knights and the Mob are also in the competition, motivating the LMNTRIX to practice extra hard. While the rest of the crew are at a bar, Sean and Andie reveal they have broken up with their respective partners. Moose is kissed by another girl while freestyle dancing at the bar, which his girlfriend Camille Gage witnesses. She runs off, prompting Moose to leave the crew and return to Los Angeles to make up with her. The LMNTRIX battle the Mob in a Vortex exhibition match; during the battle, Sean tries to force Andie to perform a trick they tried during one of their practices but Andie refuses and leaves. The LMNTRIX, however, still win the battle and the Mob leave, angry at Sean. Sean finds Andie outside, where she confronts him about his actions, saying she was not ready to perform the trick. Sean realizes that he has been selfish and made a lot of mistakes; he apologizes to the Mob and later makes up with Andie and the LMNTRIX.

Moose goes home and finds Camille on their patio, where she reveals that she wasn't actually upset at him, but was jealous when she saw his dancing and realized that she hasn't committed herself to it, despite being a talented dancer; they later make up. Chad and Jenny Kido overhear Alexxa Brava, the host of The Vortex, and Jasper, the leader of the Grim Knights, making out, realizing that Alexxa is rigging the competition. Once the whole crew finds out, they come up with a plan to teach Alexxa and the Grim Knights a lesson.

Moose returns and rejoins the crew (bringing Camille along), and the Mob join forces with the LMNTRIX for the competition. When the finals of The Vortex approach (the Grim Knights vs. the LMNTRIX), the Grim Knights give a great performance, which Alexxa remarks will be hard to beat. Before LMNTRIX perform, Sean takes the stage and discusses with the crowd that his experiences have taught him what really matters. He then persuades the crowd to forget about winning or losing and just enjoy the show. The rest of the crew then take the stage and give an amazing performance. Sean and Andie decide to end the dance by performing the trick Sean wanted her to do earlier in the film, which they successfully complete, followed by a passionate kiss between the two, leaving the crowd amazed.

The producers call Alexxa and inform her that the LMNTRIX won and that they will get the three-year contract for their own show. The film ends with the LMNTRIX and the Mob happily celebrating their excellent performance and victory.

Cast

 Ryan Guzman as Sean Asa 
 Briana Evigan as Andrea "Andie" West
 Adam Sevani as Robert "Moose" Alexander III
 Alyson Stoner as Camille 
 Misha Gabriel as Eddy
 Izabella Miko as Alexxa Brava
 Stephen "tWitch" Boss as Jason Hardlerson
 Stephen "Stevo" Jones as Jasper
 Chadd "Madd Chadd" Smith as Vladd
 Parris Goebel as Violet
 David "Kid David" Shreibman as Chad
 Mari Koda as Jenny Kido
 Christopher Scott as Hair
 Luis Rosado as Monster
 Martín Lombard as Martin Santiago
 Facundo Lombard as Marcos Santiago
 Cyrus "Glitch" Spencer as Gauge
 Celestina Aladekoba as Celestina
 Freddy HS as Accounting Manager
 Karin Konoval as Ana

Soundtrack 

Step Up: All In (Original Motion Picture Soundtrack) is a soundtrack album from the film of the same name. The album was released on August 5, 2014, by Ultra Records.

Home media
The film was released on DVD and Blu-ray on November 4, 2014.

Reception

Critical response
The film was met with mixed reviews. On Rotten Tomatoes, the film has an approval rating of 42% based on 52 reviews, with an average rating of 5.03/10. The website's consensus states: "With slick choreography all too often interrupted by feeble attempts at plot, Step Up: All In would be more fun with all of its dialogue edited out". On Metacritic, the film has a weighted average score of 45 out of 100 based on reviews from 17 critics, indicating "mixed or average reviews". Audiences polled by CinemaScore gave the film a grade B+.

Box office
The film debuted at #6 in the North American box office, earning $6.5 million. The film grossed $14,904,384 in America and $71,261,262 in other territories for a worldwide total of $86,165,646, making it the lowest-grossing film in the series.

See also
 List of films set in Las Vegas

References

External links
 

Step Up (film series)
2014 films
2010s musical films
2014 romantic drama films
American dance films
American musical drama films
American romantic drama films
American romantic musical films
Films about dance competitions
Films set in 2014
Films set in Los Angeles
Films set in the Las Vegas Valley
Films shot in the Las Vegas Valley
Films shot in Vancouver
2010s English-language films
2010s hip hop films
American sequel films
Summit Entertainment films
Entertainment One films
2014 directorial debut films
Films directed by Trish Sie
2010s American films